Jeyson Joel Vega Duarte (born 12 July 1983) is a Paraguayan football midfielder.

Club career
He last played for FAS of El Salvador.

External links
 El Grafico Profile 
 

1983 births
Living people
Association football forwards
Paraguayan footballers
Cerro Porteño players
12 de Octubre Football Club players
Silvio Pettirossi footballers
C.D. FAS footballers
Sportivo Trinidense footballers
Expatriate footballers in El Salvador